{{DISPLAYTITLE:Nav1.8}}

Nav1.8 is a sodium ion channel subtype that in humans is encoded by the SCN10A gene.

Nav1.8-containing channels are tetrodotoxin (TTX)-resistant voltage-gated channels. Nav1.8 is expressed specifically in the dorsal root ganglion (DRG), in unmyelinated, small-diameter sensory neurons called C-fibres, and is involved in nociception. C-fibres can be activated by noxious thermal or mechanical stimuli and thus can carry pain messages.

The specific location of Nav1.8 in sensory neurons of the DRG may make it a key therapeutic target for the development of new analgesics and the treatment of chronic pain.

Function 

Voltage-gated sodium ion channels (VGSC) are essential in producing and propagating action potentials. Tetrodotoxin, a toxin found in pufferfish, is able to block some VGSCs and therefore is used to distinguish the different subtypes. There are three TTX-resistant VGSC: Nav1.5, Nav1.8 and Nav1.9. Nav1.8 and Nav1.9 are both expressed in nociceptors (damage-sensing neurons). Nav1.7, Nav1.8 and Nav1.9 are found in the DRG and help mediate chronic inflammatory pain. Nav1.8 is an α-type channel subunit consisting of four homologous domains, each with six transmembrane regions, of which one is a voltage sensor. 

Voltage clamp methods have demonstrated that NaV1.8 is unique, among sodium channels, in exhibiting relatively depolarized steady-state inactivation.  Thus, NaV1.8 remains available to operate, when neurons are depolarized to levels that inactivate other sodium channels.  Voltage clamp has been used to show how action potentials in DRG cells are shaped by TTX-resistant sodium channels. Nav1.8 contributes the most to sustaining the depolarizing stage of action repetitive high-frequency potentials in nociceptive sensory neurons because it activates quickly and remaining activated after detecting a noxious stimulus. Therefore, Nav1.8 contributes to hyperalgesia (increased sensitivity to pain) and allodynia (pain from stimuli that do not usually cause it), which are elements of chronic pain. Nav1.8 knockout mice studies have shown that the channel is associated with inflammatory and neuropathic pain. Moreover, Nav1.8 plays a crucial role in cold pain. Reducing the temperature from 30 °C to 10 °C slows the activation of VGSCs and hence decreases the current. However, Nav1.8 is cold-resistant and is able to generate action potentials in the cold to carry information from nociceptors to the central nervous system (CNS). Furthermore, Nav1.8-null mice failed to produce action potentials, indicating that Nav1.8 is essential to the perception of pain in cold temperatures.

Although the early studies on the biophysics of NaV1.8 channels were carried out in rodent channels, more recent studies have examined the properties of human NaV1.8 channels.  Notably, human NaV1.8 channels exhibit an inactivation voltage-dependence that is even more depolarized than that in rodents, and it also exhibits a larger persistent current. Thus, the influence of human NaV1.8 channels on firing of sensory neurons may be even larger than that of rodent NaV1.8 channels.

Gain-of-function mutations of NaV1.8, identified in patients with painful peripheral neuropathies, have been found to make DRG neurons hyper excitable, and thus are causes of pain.  Although NaV1.8 is not normally expressed within the cerebellum, its expression is up-regulated in cerebellar Purkinje cells in animal models of MS (Multiple Sclerosis), and in human MS. The presence of NaV1.8 channels within these cerebellar neurons, where it is not normally present, increases their excitability and alters their firing pattern in vitro, and in rodents with experimental autoimmune encephalomyelitis, a model of MS. At a behavioral level, the ectopic expression of NaV1.8 within cerebellar Purkinje neurons has been shown to impair motor performance in a transgenic model.

Clinical significance

Pain signalling pathways
Nociceptors are different from other sensory neurons in that they have a low activating threshold and consequently increase their response to constant stimuli. Therefore, nociceptors are easily sensitised by agents such as bradykinin and nerve growth factor, which are released at the site of tissue injury, ultimately causing changes to ion channel conductance. VGSCs have been shown to increase in density after nerve injury. Therefore, VGSCs can be modulated by many different hyperalgesic agents that are released after nerve injury. Further examples include prostaglandin E2 (PGE2), serotonin and adenosine, which all act to increase the current through Nav1.8.

Prostaglandins such as PGE2 can sensitise nociceptors to thermal, chemical and mechanical stimuli and increase the excitability of DRG sensory neurons. This occurs because PGE2 modulates the trafficking of Nav1.8 by binding to G-protein-coupled EP2 receptor, which in turn activates protein kinase A. Protein kinase A phosphorylates Nav1.8 at intracellular sites, resulting in increased sodium ion currents. Evidence for a link between PGE2 and hyperalgesia comes from an antisense deoxynucleotide knockdown of Nav1.8 in the DRG of rats. Another modulator of Nav1.8 is the ε isoform of PKC. This isoform is activated by the inflammatory mediator bradykinin and phosphorylates Nav1.8, causing an increase in sodium current in the sensory neurons, which promotes mechanical hyperalgesia.

Brugada syndrome 
Mutations in SCN10A are associated with Brugada syndrome.

Membrane trafficking

Nerve growth factor levels in inflamed or injured tissues are increased creating an increased sensitivity to pain (hyperalgesia). The increased levels of nerve growth factor and tumour necrosis factor-α (TNF-α) causes the upregulation of Nav1.8 in sensory neurons via the accessory protein p11 (annexin II light chain). It has been shown using the yeast-two hybrid screening method that p11 binds to a 28-amino-acid fragment at the N terminus of Nav1.8 and promotes its translocation to the plasma membrane. This contributes to the hyperexcitability of sensory neurons during pain. p11-null nociceptive sensory neurons in mice, created using the Cre-loxP recombinase system, show a decrease in Nav1.8 expression at the plasma membrane. Therefore, disrupting the interactions between p11 and Nav1.8 may be a good therapeutic target for lowering pain.

In myelinated fibres, VGSCs are located at the nodes of Ranvier; however, in unmyelinated fibres, the exact location of VGSCs has not been determined. Nav1.8 in unmyelinated fibres has been found in clusters associated with lipid rafts along DRG fibers both in vitro and in vivo. Lipid rafts organise the cell membrane, which includes trafficking and localising ion channels. Removal of lipid rafts in the membrane using MβCD, which depletes cholesterol from the plasma membrane, leads to a shift of Nav1.8 to a non-raft portion of the membrane, causing reduced action potential firing and propagation.

Painful peripheral neuropathies

Painful peripheral neuropathies or small-fibre neuropathies are disorders of unmyelinated nociceptive C-fibres causing neuropathic pain; in some cases there is no known cause. Genetic screening of patients with these idiopathic neuropathies has uncovered mutations in the SCN9A gene, encoding the related channel Nav1.7. A gain-of-function mutation in Nav1.7 located in the DRG sensory neurons was found in nearly 30% of patients with idiopathic small fiber neuropathy in one study. This gain-of-function mutation causes an increase in excitability (hyperexcitability) of DRG sensory neurons and thus an increase in pain. Nav1.7 thus been shown to be linked to human pain; Nav1.8, by contrast, had only been associated to pain in animal studies until recently. A gain-of-function mutation was found in the Nav1.8-encoding SCN10A gene in patients with painful peripheral neuropathy. A study of 104 patients with idiopathic peripheral neuropathies who did not have the mutation in SCN9A used voltage clamp and current clamp methods, along with predictive algorithms, and yielded two gain-of-function mutations in SCN10A in three patients. Both mutations cause increased excitability in DRG sensory neurons and hence contribute to pain, but the mechanism by which they do so is not understood.

References

Further reading

External links 

Sodium channels